Western culture, also known as Western civilization, Occidental culture, or Western society, is the heritage of social norms, ethical values, traditional customs, belief systems, political systems, artifacts and technologies of the Western world. The term applies beyond Europe to countries and cultures whose histories are strongly connected to Europe by immigration, colonization or influence. Western culture is most strongly influenced by Greco-Roman culture, Germanic culture, and Christian culture.

The expansion of Greek culture into the Hellenistic world of the eastern Mediterranean led to a synthesis between Greek and Near-Eastern cultures, and major advances in literature, engineering, and science, and provided the culture for the expansion of early Christianity and the Greek New Testament. This period overlapped with and was followed by Rome, which made key contributions in law, government, engineering and political organization.

Western culture is characterized by a host of artistic, philosophic, literary and legal themes and traditions. Christianity, primarily the Roman Catholic Church, and later Protestantism has played a prominent role in the shaping of Western civilization since at least the 4th century, as did Judaism. A cornerstone of Western thought, beginning in ancient Greece and continuing through the Middle Ages and Renaissance, is the idea of rationalism in various spheres of life developed by Hellenistic philosophy, scholasticism and humanism. Empiricism later gave rise to the scientific method, the scientific revolution, and the Age of Enlightenment.

Western culture continued to develop with the Christianization of European society during the Middle Ages, the reforms triggered by the medieval renaissances, the influence of the Islamic world via Al-Andalus and Sicily (including the transfer of technology from the East, and Latin translations of Arabic texts on science and philosophy by Greek and Hellenic-influenced Islamic philosophers), and the Italian Renaissance as Greek scholars fleeing the fall of the Byzantine Empire after the Muslim conquest of Constantinople brought classical traditions and philosophy. This major change for non-Western countries and their people saw a development in modernization in those countries. Medieval Christianity is credited with creating the modern university, the modern hospital system, scientific economics, and natural law (which would later influence the creation of international law). Christianity played a role in ending practices common among European pagans at the time, such as human sacrifice and infanticide. European culture developed with a complex range of philosophy, medieval scholasticism, mysticism and Christian and secular humanism. Rational thinking developed through a long age of change and formation, with the experiments of the Enlightenment and breakthroughs in the sciences. Tendencies that have come to define modern Western societies include the concept of political pluralism, individualism, prominent subcultures or countercultures (such as New Age movements) and increasing cultural syncretism resulting from globalization and human migration.

Terminology 

"The West" as a geographical area is unclear and undefined. There is some disagreement about which nations should or should not be included in the category, when, and why. Certainly related conceptual terminology has changed over time in scope, meaning, and use. The term "western" draws on an affiliation with, and/or a perception of, a shared  philosophy, worldview, political, and religious heritage grounded in the Greco-Roman world, the legacy of the Roman Empire, and medieval concepts of Christendom. For example, whether the  Eastern Roman Empire (anachronistically/controversially referred to as the Byzantine Empire), or those countries heavily influenced by its legacy, should be counted as "Western" is an example of the possible ambiguity of the term. These questions can be traced back to the affiliatory nature of  Roman culture to the culture of Classical Greece, a persistent Greek East and Latin West language-split within the Roman Empire, and an eventual permanent splitting of the Roman Empire in 395 into  Western and  Eastern halves. And perhaps, at its worst, culminating in Pope Leo III's  transfer of the Roman Empire from the Eastern Roman Empire to the Frankish King Charlemagne in the form of the Holy Roman Empire in 800, the Great Schism of 1054, and the devastating Fourth Crusade of 1204. Conversely, traditions of scholarship around Plato, Aristotle, and Euclid had been forgotten in the Catholic west and were rediscovered by Italians from scholars fleeing the 1453 fall of the  Eastern Roman Empire. The subsequent Renaissance, a conscious effort by Europeans to revive and surpass the ideas and achievements of the Greco-Roman world, eventually encouraged the Age of Discovery, the Scientific Revolution, Age of Enlightenment, and the subsequent Industrial Revolution. Similarly, complicated relationships between virtually all the countries and regions within a broadly defined "West" can be discussed in the light of a persistently fragmented political landscape resulting in a lack of uniformity and significant diversity between the various cultures affiliating with this shared socio-cultural heritage. Thus, those cultures identifying with the West and with what it means to be "western" change over time as the geopolitical circumstances of a place changes and what is meant by the terminology changes.

It is difficult to determine which individuals or places or trends fit into which category, and the East–West contrast is sometimes criticized as  relativistic and arbitrary. Globalization has spread Western ideas so widely that almost all modern cultures are, to some extent, influenced by aspects of Western culture. Stereotypical views of "the West" have been labeled "Occidentalism", paralleling "Orientalism"—the term for the 19th-century stereotyped views of "the East".

Some philosophers have questioned whether Western culture can be considered a historically sound, unified body of thought. For example, Kwame Anthony Appiah pointed out in 2016 that many of the fundamental influences on Western culture - such as those of Greek philosophy - are also shared by the  Islamic world to a certain extent. Appiah argues that the origin of the Western and European  identity can be traced back to the 8th-century Muslim invasion of Europe via Iberia, when Christians would start to form a common Christian or European identity. Contemporary Latin chronicles from Spain referred to the victors in the  Frankish victory over the  Umayyads at the 732 Battle of Tours as "Europeans" according to Appiah, denoting a shared sense of identity.

A former, now less-acceptable synonym for "Western civilisation" was "the white race".

As Europeans discovered the extra-European world, old concepts adapted. The area that had formerly been considered the Orient ("the East") became the Near East as the interests of the European powers interfered with Meiji Japan and Qing China for the first time in the 19th century.
Thus the  Sino-Japanese War in 1894–1895 occurred in the "Far East" while troubles surrounding the decline of the Ottoman Empire occurred simultaneously in the Near East. The term "Middle East" in the mid-19th century included the territory east of the Ottoman Empire but west of China—Greater Persia and Greater India—but is now used synonymously with "Near East" in most languages.

History 

The earliest civilizations which influenced the development of Western culture were those of Mesopotamia; the area of the Tigris–Euphrates river system, largely corresponding to modern-day Iraq, northeastern Syria, southeastern Turkey and southwestern Iran: the cradle of civilization. Ancient Egypt similarly had a strong influence on Western culture.

The Greeks contrasted themselves with both their Eastern neighbours (such as the Trojans in Iliad) as well as their Northern neighbours (who they considered barbarians). Concepts of what is the West arose out of legacies of the Western and the Eastern Roman Empire. Later, ideas of the West were formed by the concepts of Latin Christendom and the Holy Roman Empire. What is thought of as Western thought today originates primarily from Greco-Roman and Christian traditions, with varying degrees of influence from the Germanic, Celtic and Slavic peoples, and includes the ideals of the Middle Ages, the Renaissance, Reformation and the Enlightenment.

The West of the Mediterranean Region during the Antiquity 

While the concept of a "West" did not exist until the emergence of the Roman Republic, the roots of the concept can be traced back to Ancient Greece. Since Homeric literature (the Trojan Wars), through the accounts of the Persian Wars of Greeks against Persians by Herodotus, and right up until the time of Alexander the Great, there was a paradigm of a contrast between Greeks and other civilizations. Greeks felt they were the most civilized and saw themselves (in the formulation of Aristotle) as something between the advanced civilizations of the Near East (who they viewed as soft and slavish) and the wild barbarians of most of Europe to the north. During this period writers like Herodotus and Xenophon would highlight the importance of freedom in the Ancient Greek world, as opposed to the perceived slavery of the so-called barbaric world.

Alexander's conquests led to the emergence of a Hellenistic civilization, representing a synthesis of Greek and Near-Eastern cultures in the Eastern Mediterranean region. The Near-Eastern civilizations of Ancient Egypt and the Levant, which came under Greek rule, became part of the Hellenistic world. The most important Hellenistic centre of learning was Ptolemaic Egypt, which attracted Greek, Egyptian, Jewish, Persian, Phoenician and even Indian scholars. Hellenistic science, philosophy, architecture, literature and art later provided a foundation embraced and built upon by the Roman Empire as it swept up Europe and the Mediterranean world, including the Hellenistic world in its conquests in the 1st century BCE.

Following the Roman conquest of the Hellenistic world, the concept of a "West" arose, as there was a cultural divide between the Greek East and Latin West. The Latin-speaking Western Roman Empire consisted of Western Europe and Northwest Africa, while the Greek-speaking Eastern Roman Empire consisted of the Balkans, Asia Minor, Egypt and Levant. The "Greek" East was generally wealthier and more advanced than the "Latin" West. With the exception of Italia, the wealthiest provinces of the Roman Empire were in the East, particularly Roman Egypt which was the wealthiest Roman province outside of Italia. Nevertheless, the Celts in the West created some significant literature in the ancient world whenever they were given the opportunity (an example being the poet Caecilius Statius), and they developed a large amount of scientific knowledge themselves (as seen in their Coligny Calendar).

For about five hundred years, the Roman Empire maintained the Greek East and consolidated a Latin West, but an east–west division remained, reflected in many cultural norms of the two areas, including language. Eventually, the empire became increasingly split into a Western and Eastern part, reviving old ideas of a contrast between an advanced East, and a rugged West.

From the time of Alexander the Great (the Hellenistic period), Greek civilization came in contact with Jewish civilization. Christianity would eventually emerge from the syncretism of Hellenic culture, Roman culture, and Second Temple Judaism, gradually spreading across the Roman Empire and eclipsing its antecedents and influences. The rise of Christianity reshaped much of the Greco-Roman tradition and culture; the Christianised culture would be the basis for the development of Western civilization after the fall of Rome (which resulted from increasing pressure from barbarians outside Roman culture). Roman culture also mixed with Celtic, Germanic, and Slavic cultures, which slowly became integrated into Western culture: starting mainly with their acceptance of Christianity.

The birth of the European West during the Middle Ages 

The Medieval West referred specifically to the Catholic "Latin" West, also called "Frankish" during Charlemagne's reign, in contrast to the Orthodox East, where Greek remained the language of the Byzantine Empire.

After the fall of Rome, much of Greco-Roman art, literature, science and even technology were all but lost in the western part of the old empire. However, this would become the center of a new West. Europe fell into political anarchy, with many warring kingdoms and principalities. Under the Frankish kings, it eventually, and partially, reunified, and the anarchy evolved into feudalism.

Much of the basis of the post-Roman cultural world had been set before the fall of the Western Roman Empire, mainly through the integration and reshaping of Roman ideas through Christian thought. The Greek and Roman paganism was gradually replaced by Christianity, first with its legalisation with the Edict of Milan and then the Edict of Thessalonica which made it the State church of the Roman Empire. Roman Catholic Christianity, served as a unifying force in Christian parts of Europe, and in some respects replaced or competed with the secular authorities. The Jewish Christian tradition out of which it had emerged was all but extinguished, and antisemitism became increasingly entrenched or even integral to Christendom. Much of art and literature, law, education, and politics were preserved in the teachings of the Church. The Eastern Orthodox Church founded many cathedrals, monasteries and seminaries, some of which continue to exist today.

After the fall of the Roman Empire, many of the classical Greek texts were translated into Arabic and preserved in the medieval Islamic world. The Greek classics along with Arabic science, philosophy and technology were transmitted to Western Europe and translated into Latin, sparking the Renaissance of the 12th century and 13th century.

Medieval Christianity is credited with creating the first modern universities. The Catholic Church established a hospital system in Medieval Europe that vastly improved upon the Roman valetudinaria and Greek healing temples. These hospitals were established to cater to "particular social groups marginalized by poverty, sickness, and age," according to the historian of hospitals, Guenter Risse. Christianity played a role in ending practices common among pagan societies, such as human sacrifice, slavery, infanticide and polygamy. Francisco de Vitoria, a disciple of Thomas Aquinas and a Catholic thinker who studied the issue regarding the human rights of colonized natives, is recognized by the United Nations as a father of international law, and now also by historians of economics and democracy as a leading light for the West's democracy and rapid economic development. Joseph Schumpeter, an economist of the twentieth century, referring to the Scholastics, wrote, "it is they who come nearer than does any other group to having been the 'founders' of scientific economics."

In a broader sense, the Middle Ages, with its fertile encounter between Greek philosophical reasoning and Levantine monotheism was not confined to the West but also stretched into the old East. The philosophy and science of Classical Greece were largely forgotten in Europe after the collapse of the Western Roman Empire, other than in isolated monastic enclaves (notably in Ireland, which had become Christian but was never conquered by Rome). The learning of Classical Antiquity was better preserved in the Eastern Roman Empire. Justinian's Corpus Juris Civilis Roman civil law code was created in the East in his capital of Constantinople, and that city maintained trade and intermittent political control over outposts such as Venice in the West for centuries. Classical Greek learning was also subsumed, preserved, and elaborated in the rising Eastern world, which gradually supplanted Roman-Byzantine control as a dominant cultural-political force. Thus, much of the learning of classical antiquity was slowly reintroduced to European civilization in the centuries following the collapse of the Western Roman Empire.

The rediscovery of the Justinian Code in Western Europe early in the 10th century rekindled a passion for the discipline of law, which crossed many of the re-forming boundaries between East and West. In the Catholic or Frankish west, Roman law became the foundation on which all legal concepts and systems were based. Its influence is found in all Western legal systems, although in different manners and to different extents. The study of canon law, the legal system of the Catholic Church, fused with that of Roman law to form the basis of the refounding of Western legal scholarship. During the Reformation and Enlightenment, the ideas of civil rights, equality before the law, procedural justice, and democracy as the ideal form of society began to be institutionalized as principles forming the basis of modern Western culture, particularly in Protestant regions.

In the 14th century, starting from Italy and then spreading throughout Europe, there was a massive artistic, architectural, scientific and philosophical revival, as a result of the Christian revival of Greek philosophy, and the long Christian medieval tradition that established the use of reason as one of the most important of human activities. This period is commonly referred to as the Renaissance. In the following century, this process was further enhanced by an exodus of Greek Christian priests and scholars to Italian cities such as Florence and Venice after the end of the Byzantine Empire with the fall of Constantinople.

From Late Antiquity, through the Middle Ages, and onwards, while Eastern Europe was shaped by the Eastern Orthodox Church, Southern and Central Europe were increasingly stabilized by the Catholic Church which, as Roman imperial governance faded from view, was the only consistent force in Western Europe. In 1054 came the Great Schism that, following the Greek East and Latin West divide, separated Europe into religious and cultural regions present to this day. Until the Age of Enlightenment, Christian culture took over as the predominant force in Western civilization, guiding the course of philosophy, art, and science for many years. Movements in art and philosophy, such as the Humanist movement of the Renaissance and the Scholastic movement of the High Middle Ages, were motivated by a drive to connect Catholicism with Greek and Arab thought imported by Christian pilgrims. However, due to the division in Western Christianity caused by the Protestant Reformation and the Enlightenment, religious influence—especially the temporal power of the Pope—began to wane.

From the late 15th century to the 17th century, Western culture began to spread to other parts of the world through explorers and missionaries during the Age of Discovery, and by imperialists from the 17th century to the early 20th century. During the Great Divergence, a term coined by Samuel Huntington the Western world overcame pre-modern growth constraints and emerged during the 19th century as the most powerful and wealthy world civilization of the time, eclipsing Qing China, Mughal India, Tokugawa Japan, and the Ottoman Empire. The process was accompanied and reinforced by the Age of Discovery and continued into the modern period. Scholars have proposed a wide variety of theories to explain why the Great Divergence happened, including lack of government intervention, geography, colonialism, and customary traditions.

Expansion of the West: the Era of Colonialism (15th–20th centuries)

Early modern era
The Age of Discovery faded into the Age of Enlightenment of the 18th century, during which cultural and intellectual forces in European society emphasized reason, analysis, and individualism rather than traditional lines of authority. It challenged the authority of institutions that were deeply rooted in society, such as the Catholic Church; there was much talk of ways to reform society with toleration, science and skepticism.

Philosophers of the Enlightenment included Francis Bacon, René Descartes, John Locke, Baruch Spinoza, Voltaire (1694–1778), Jean-Jacques Rousseau, David Hume, and Immanuel Kant, who influenced society by publishing widely read works. Upon learning about enlightened views, some rulers met with intellectuals and tried to apply their reforms, such as allowing for toleration, or accepting multiple religions, in what became known as enlightened absolutism. New ideas and beliefs spread around Europe and were fostered by an increase in literacy due to a departure from solely religious texts. Publications include Encyclopédie (1751–72) that was edited by Denis Diderot and Jean le Rond d'Alembert. The Dictionnaire philosophique (Philosophical Dictionary, 1764) and Letters on the English (1733) written by Voltaire spread the ideals of the Enlightenment.

Coinciding with the Age of Enlightenment was the scientific revolution, spearheaded by Newton. This included the emergence of modern science, during which developments in mathematics, physics, astronomy, biology (including human anatomy) and chemistry transformed views of society and nature. While its dates are disputed, the publication in 1543 of Nicolaus Copernicus's De revolutionibus orbium coelestium (On the Revolutions of the Heavenly Spheres) is often cited as marking the beginning of the scientific revolution, and its completion is attributed to the "grand synthesis" of Newton's 1687 Principia.

Industrial Revolution

The Industrial Revolution was the transition to new manufacturing processes in the period from about 1760 to sometime between 1820 and 1840. This included going from hand production methods to machines, new chemical manufacturing and iron production processes, improved efficiency of water power, the increasing use of steam power, and the development of machine tools. These transitions began in Great Britain and spread to Western Europe and North America within a few decades.

The Industrial Revolution marks a major turning point in history; almost every aspect of daily life was influenced in some way. In particular, average income and population began to exhibit unprecedented sustained growth. Some economists say that the major impact of the Industrial Revolution was that the standard of living for the general population began to increase consistently for the first time in history, although others have said that it did not begin to meaningfully improve until the late 19th and 20th centuries. The precise start and end of the Industrial Revolution is still debated among historians, as is the pace of economic and social changes. GDP per capita was broadly stable before the Industrial Revolution and the emergence of the modern capitalist economy, while the Industrial Revolution began an era of per-capita economic growth in capitalist economies. Economic historians are in agreement that the onset of the Industrial Revolution is the most important event in the history of humanity since the domestication of animals, plants and fire.

The First Industrial Revolution evolved into the Second Industrial Revolution in the transition years between 1840 and 1870, when technological and economic progress continued with the increasing adoption of steam transport (steam-powered railways, boats, and ships), the large-scale manufacture of machine tools and the increasing use of machinery in steam-powered factories.

After the Industrial Revolution

Tendencies that have come to define modern Western societies include the concept of political pluralism, individualism, prominent subcultures or countercultures (such as New Age movements) and increasing cultural syncretism resulting from globalization and human migration. Western culture has been heavily influenced by the Renaissance, the Ages of Discovery and Enlightenment and the Industrial and Scientific Revolutions.

In the 20th century, Christianity declined in influence in many Western countries, mostly in the European Union where some member states have experienced falling church attendance and membership in recent years, and also elsewhere. Secularism (separating religion from politics and science) increased. Christianity remains the dominant religion in the Western world, where 70% are Christians.

The West went through a series of great cultural and social changes between 1945 and 1980. The emergent mass media (film, radio, television and recorded music) created a global culture that could ignore national frontiers. Literacy became almost universal, encouraging the growth of books, magazines and newspapers. The influence of cinema and radio remained, while televisions became near essentials in every home.

By the mid-20th century, Western culture was exported worldwide, and the development and growth of international transport and telecommunication (such as transatlantic cable and the radiotelephone) played a decisive role in modern globalization. The West has contributed a great many technological, political, philosophical, artistic and religious aspects to modern international culture: having been a crucible of Catholicism, Protestantism, democracy, industrialisation; the first major civilisation to seek to abolish slavery during the 19th century, the first to enfranchise women (beginning in Australasia at the end of the 19th century) and the first to put to use such technologies as steam, electric and nuclear power. The West invented cinema, television, the personal computer and the Internet; developed sports such as soccer, cricket, golf, tennis, rugby, basketball, and volleyball; and transported humans to an astronomical object for the first time with the 1969 Apollo 11 Moon Landing.

It was, in recent history, and remains, the dominant power and director of human civilization.

Arts and humanities 

While dance, music, visual art, story-telling, and architecture are human universals, they are expressed in the West in certain characteristic ways.

In Western dance, music, plays and other arts, the performers are only very infrequently masked. There are essentially no taboos against depicting a god, or other religious figures, in a representational fashion.

Music 

In music, Catholic monks developed the first forms of modern Western musical notation to standardize liturgy throughout the worldwide Church, and an enormous body of religious music has been composed for it through the ages. This led directly to the emergence and development of European classical music and its many derivatives. The Baroque style, which encompassed music, art, and architecture, was particularly encouraged by the post-Reformation Catholic Church as such forms offered a means of religious expression that was stirring and emotional, intended to stimulate religious fervor.

The symphony, concerto, sonata, opera, and oratorio have their origins in Italy. Many musical instruments developed in the West have come to see widespread use all over the world; among them are the guitar, violin, piano, pipe organ, saxophone, trombone, clarinet, accordion, and the theremin. In turn, it has been claimed that some European instruments have roots in earlier Eastern instruments that were adopted from the medieval Islamic world. The solo piano, symphony orchestra, and the string quartet are also significant musical innovations of the West.

Painting and photography 
Jan van Eyck, among other renaissance painters, made great advances in oil painting, and perspective drawings and paintings had their earliest practitioners in Florence. In art, the Celtic knot is a very distinctive Western repeated motif. Depictions of the nude human male and female in photography, painting, and sculpture are frequently considered to have special artistic merit. Realistic portraiture is especially valued.

Photography and the motion picture as both a technology and basis for entirely new art forms were also developed in the West.

Dance and performing arts 

The ballet is a distinctively Western form of performance dance. The ballroom dance is an important Western variety of dance for the elite. The polka, the square dance, the flamenco, and the Irish step dance are very well known Western forms of folk dance.

Greek and Roman theatre are considered the antecedents of modern theatre, and forms such as medieval theatre, Passion Plays, morality plays, and commedia dell'arte are considered highly influential. Elizabethan theatre, with playwrights including William Shakespeare, Christopher Marlowe, and Ben Jonson, is considered one of the most formative and important eras for modern drama.

The soap opera, a popular culture dramatic form, originated in the United States first on radio in the 1930s, then a couple of decades later on television. The music video was also developed in the West in the middle of the 20th century. Musical theatre was developed in the West in the 19th and 20th Centuries, from music hall, comic opera, and Vaudeville; with significant contributions from the Jewish diaspora, African-Americans, and other marginalized peoples.

Literature 

Western literature encompasses literary traditions of Europe, as well as Northern America and Latin America.

While epic literary works in verse such as the Mahabharata and Homer's Iliad are ancient and occurred worldwide, the prose novel as a distinct form of storytelling, with developed, consistent human characters and, typically, some connected overall plot (although both of these characteristics have sometimes been modified and played with in later times), was popularized by the West in the 17th and 18th centuries. Of course, extended prose fiction had existed much earlier; both novels of adventure and romance in the Hellenistic world and in Heian Japan. Both Petronius' Satyricon (c. 60 CE) and the Tale of Genji by Murasaki Shikibu (c. 1000 CE) have been cited as the world's first major novel but they had a very limited long-term impact on literary writing beyond their own day until much more recent times.

The novel, which made its appearance in the 18th century, is an essentially European creation. Chinese and Japanese literature contain some works that may be thought of as novels, but only the European novel is couched in terms of a personal analysis of personal dilemmas.

As in its artistic tradition, European literature pays deep tribute to human suffering. Tragedy, from its ritually and mythologically inspired Greek origins to modern forms where struggle and downfall are often rooted in psychological or social, rather than mythical, motives, is also widely considered a specifically European creation and can be seen as a forerunner of some aspects of both the novel and of classical opera.

The validity of reason was postulated in both Christian philosophy and the Greco-Roman classics. Christianity laid a stress on the inward aspects of actions and on motives, notions that were foreign to the ancient world. This subjectivity, which grew out of the Christian belief that man could achieve a personal union with God, resisted all challenges and made itself the fulcrum on which all literary exposition turned, including the 20th–21st century novels.

Architecture 

Important Western architectural motifs include the Doric, Corinthian, and Ionic orders of Greek architecture, and the Romanesque, Gothic, Baroque, and Victorian styles, which are still widely recognized and used in contemporary Western architecture. Much of Western architecture emphasizes repetition of simple motifs, straight lines and expansive, undecorated planes. A modern ubiquitous architectural form that emphasizes this characteristic is the skyscraper, their modern equivalent first developed in New York and Chicago. The predecessor of the skyscraper can be found in the medieval towers erected in Bologna.

Cuisine 

Western foodways were, until recently, considered to have their roots in the cuisines of Classical Rome and Greece, but the influence of Arab and Near Eastern cuisine on the West has become a topic of research in recent decades. The Crusaders, known mostly for fighting over holy land, settled in the Levant and acclimated to the local culture and cuisine. Fulcher of Chartres said "For we who were occidentals have now become orientals." These cultural experiences, carried back to France by notables like Eleanor of Aquitaine influenced Western European foodways. Many Oriental ingredients were relatively new to the Western lands. Sugar, almonds, pistachios, rosewater, and dried citrus fruits were all novelties to the Crusaders who encountered them in Saracen lands. Pepper, ginger and cinnamon were the most widely used spices of the European courts and noble households. By the end of the Middle Ages cloves, nutmeg, mastic, galingale and other imported spices had become part of the Western cuisine.

Saracen influence can be seen in medieval cookbooks. Some recipes retain their Arabic names in Italian translations of the Liber de Coquina. Known as bruet Sarassinois in the cuisine of North France, the concept of sweet and sour sauce is attested to in Greek tradition when Anthimus finishes his stew with vinegar and honey. Saracens combined sweet ingredients like date-juice and honey with pomegranate, lemons and citrus juices, or other sour ingredients. The technique of browning pieces of meat and simmering in liquid with vegetables is used in many recipes from the Baghdad cookery book. The same technique appears in the late-13th century Viandier. Fried pieces of beef simmered in wine with sugar and cloves was called bruet of Sarcynesse in English.

Scientific and technological inventions and discoveries 

A notable feature of Western culture is its strong emphasis and focus on innovation and invention through science and technology, and its ability to generate new processes, materials and material artifacts with its roots dating back to the Ancient Greeks. The scientific method as "a method or procedure that has characterized natural science since the 17th century, consisting in systematic observation, measurement, and experiment, and the formulation, testing, and modification of hypotheses" was fashioned by the 17th-century Italian Galileo Galilei, with roots in the work of medieval scholars such as the 11th-century Iraqi physicist Ibn al-Haytham and the 13th-century English friar Roger Bacon.

By the will of the Swedish inventor Alfred Nobel the Nobel Prizes were established in 1895. The prizes in Chemistry, Literature, Peace, Physics, and Physiology or Medicine were first awarded in 1901. The percentage of ethnically European Nobel prize winners during the first and second halves of the 20th century were respectively 98 and 94 percent.

The West is credited with the development of the steam engine and adapting its use into factories, and for the generation of electric power. The electrical motor, dynamo, transformer, electric light, and most of the familiar electrical appliances, were inventions of the West. The Otto and the Diesel internal combustion engines are products whose genesis and early development were in the West. Nuclear power stations are derived from the first atomic pile constructed in Chicago in 1942.

Communication devices and systems including the telegraph, the telephone, radio, television, communications and navigation satellites, mobile phone, and the Internet were all invented by Westerners. The pencil, ballpoint pen, Cathode ray tube, liquid-crystal display, light-emitting diode, camera, photocopier, laser printer, ink jet printer, plasma display screen and World Wide Web were also invented in the West.

Ubiquitous materials including aluminum, clear glass, synthetic rubber, synthetic diamond and the plastics polyethylene, polypropylene, polyvinyl chloride and polystyrene were discovered and developed or invented in the West. Iron and steel ships, bridges and skyscrapers first appeared in the West. Nitrogen fixation and petrochemicals were invented by Westerners. Most of the elements were discovered and named in the West, as well as the contemporary atomic theories to explain them.

The transistor, integrated circuit, memory chip, first programming language and computer were all first seen in the West. The ship's chronometer, the screw propeller, the locomotive, bicycle, automobile, and airplane were all invented in the West. Eyeglasses, the telescope, the microscope and electron microscope, all the varieties of chromatography, protein and DNA sequencing, computerised tomography, nuclear magnetic resonance, x-rays, and light, ultraviolet and infrared spectroscopy, were all first developed and applied in Western laboratories, hospitals and factories.

In medicine, the pure antibiotics were created in the West. The method of preventing Rh disease, the treatment of diabetes, and the germ theory of disease were discovered by Westerners. The eradication of smallpox, was led by a Westerner, Donald Henderson. Radiography, computed tomography, positron emission tomography and medical ultrasonography are important diagnostic tools developed in the West. Other important diagnostic tools of clinical chemistry, including the methods of spectrophotometry, electrophoresis and immunoassay, were first devised by Westerners. So were the stethoscope, the electrocardiograph, and the endoscope. Vitamins, hormonal contraception, hormones, insulin, beta blockers and ACE inhibitors, along with a host of other medically proven drugs, were first used to treat disease in the West. The double-blind study and evidence-based medicine are critical scientific techniques widely used in the West for medical purposes.

In mathematics, calculus, statistics, logic, vectors, tensors and complex analysis, group theory, abstract algebra and topology were developed by Westerners. In biology, evolution, chromosomes, DNA, genetics and the methods of molecular biology are creations of the West. In physics, the science of mechanics and quantum mechanics, relativity, thermodynamics, and statistical mechanics were all developed by Westerners. The discoveries and inventions by Westerners in electromagnetism include Coulomb's law (1785), the first battery (1800), the unity of electricity and magnetism (1820), Biot–Savart law (1820), Ohm's Law (1827), and Maxwell's equations (1871). The atom, nucleus, electron, neutron and proton were all unveiled by Westerners.

The world's most widely adopted system of measurement, the International System of Units, derived from the metric system, was first developed in France and evolved through contributions from various Westerners.

In business, economics, and finance, double entry bookkeeping, credit cards, and the charge card were all first used in the West.

Westerners are also known for their explorations of the globe and outer space. The first expedition to circumnavigate the Earth (1522) was by Westerners, as well as the first journey to the South Pole (1911), and the first Moon landing (1969). The landing of robots on Mars (2004 and 2012) and on an asteroid (2001), the Voyager 2 explorations of the outer planets (Uranus in 1986 and Neptune in 1989), Voyager 1s passage into interstellar space (2013), and New Horizons flyby of Pluto (2015) were significant recent Western achievements.

Media 

The roots of modern-day Western mass media can be traced back to the late 15th century, when printing presses began to operate throughout wealthy European cities. The emergence of news media in the 17th century has to be seen in close connection with the spread of the printing press, from which the publishing press derives its name.

In the 16th century, a decrease in the preeminence of Latin in its literary use, along with the impact of economic change, the discoveries arising from trade and travel, navigation to the New World, science and arts and the development of increasingly rapid communications through print led to a rising corpus of vernacular media content in European society.

After the launch of the satellite Sputnik 1 by the Soviet Union in 1957, satellite transmission technology was dramatically realised, with the United States launching Telstar in 1962 linking live media broadcasts from the UK to the US. The first digital broadcast satellite (DBS) system began transmitting in US in 1975.

Beginning in the 1990s, the Internet has contributed to a tremendous increase in the accessibility of Western media content. Departing from media offered in bundled content packages (magazines, CDs, television and radio slots), the Internet has primarily offered unbundled content items (articles, audio and video files).

Religion 

The native religions of Europe were polytheistic but not homogenous – however, they were similar insofar as they were predominantly Indo-European in origin. Roman religion was similar to but not the same as Hellenic religion – likewise for indigenous Germanic polytheism, Celtic polytheism and Slavic polytheism. Before this time many Europeans from the north, especially Scandinavians, remained polytheistic, though southern Europe was predominantly Christian from the 5th century onwards.

Western culture at some level is influenced by the Judeo-Christian-Islamic and Greco-Roman traditions. These cultures had a number of similarities, such as a common emphasis on the individual, but they also embody fundamentally conflicting worldviews. For example, in Judaism and Christianity, God is the ultimate authority, while Greco-Roman tradition considers the ultimate authority to be reason. Christian attempts to reconcile these frameworks were responsible for the preservation of Greek philosophy. Historically, Europe has been the center and cradle of Christian civilization.

According to a survey by Pew Research Center from 2011, Christianity remains the dominant religion in the Western world where 70–84% are Christians, According to this survey, 76% of Europeans described themselves as Christians, and about 86% of the Americas' population identified themselves as Christians, (90% in Latin America and 77% in North America). 73% in Oceania self-identify as Christian, and 76% in South Africa are Christian.

2012 Eurobarometer polls about religiosity in the European Union in 2012 found that Christianity was the largest religion in the European Union, accounting for 72% of the EU population. Catholics are the largest Christian group, accounting for 48% of the EU citizens, while Protestants make up 12%, Eastern Orthodox make up 8% and other Christians make up 4%. Non-believers/Agnostics account for 16%, atheists account for 7%, and Muslims account for 2%.

At the same there has been an increase in the share of agnostic or atheist residents in Europe; these made up about 18% of the European population in 2012. In particular, over half of the populations of the Czech Republic (79% of the population was agnostic, atheist or irreligious), the United Kingdom (52%), Germany (25–33%), France (30–35%) and the Netherlands (39–44%) are agnostic or atheist.

As in other areas, the Jewish diaspora and Judaism exist in the Western world.

There are also small but increasing numbers of people across the Western world who seek to revive the indigenous religions of their European ancestors; such groups include Germanic, Roman, Hellenic, Celtic, Slavic, and polytheistic reconstructionist movements. Likewise, Wicca, New Age spirituality and other neo-pagan belief systems enjoy notable minority support in Western states.

Sport 

Since classical antiquity, sport has been an important facet of Western cultural expression.

A wide range of sports was already established by the time of Ancient Greece and the military culture and the development of sports in Greece influenced one another considerably. Sports became such a prominent part of their culture that the Greeks created the Olympic Games, which in ancient times were held every four years in a small village in the Peloponnesus called Olympia. Baron Pierre de Coubertin, a Frenchman, instigated the modern revival of the Olympic movement. The first modern Olympic games were held at Athens in 1896.

The Romans built immense structures such as the amphitheatres to house their festivals of sport. The Romans exhibited a passion for blood sports, such as the infamous Gladiatorial battles that pitted contestants against one another in a fight to the death. The Olympic Games revived many of the sports of classical antiquity—such as Greco-Roman wrestling, discus and javelin.
The sport of bullfighting is a traditional spectacle of Spain, Portugal, southern France, and some Latin American countries. It traces its roots to prehistoric bull worship and sacrifice and is often linked to Rome, where many human-versus-animal events were held. Bullfighting spread from Spain to its American colonies, and in the 19th century to France, where it developed into a distinctive form in its own right.

Jousting and hunting were popular sports in the European Middle Ages, and the aristocratic classes developed passions for leisure activities. A great number of popular global sports were first developed or codified in Europe. The modern game of golf originated in Scotland, where the first written record of golf is James II's banning of the game in 1457, as an unwelcome distraction to learning archery.

The Industrial Revolution that began in Great Britain in the 18th century brought increased leisure time, leading to more opportunities for citizens to participate in athletic activities and also follow spectator sports. These trends continued with the advent of mass media and global communication. The bat and ball sport of cricket was first played in England during the 16th century and was exported around the globe via the British Empire. A number of popular modern sports were devised or codified in the United Kingdom during the 19th century and obtained global prominence; these include ping pong, modern tennis, association football, netball and rugby.

Football (or soccer) remains hugely popular in Europe, but has grown from its origins to be known as the world game. Similarly, sports such as cricket, rugby, and netball were exported around the world, particularly among countries in the Commonwealth of Nations, thus India and Australia are among the strongest cricketing states, while victory in the Rugby World Cup has been shared among New Zealand, Australia, England, and South Africa.

Australian Rules Football, an Australian variation of football with similarities to Gaelic football and rugby, evolved in the British colony of Victoria in the mid-19th century. The United States also developed unique variations of English sports. English migrants took antecedents of baseball to America during the colonial period. The history of American football can be traced to early versions of rugby football and association football. Many games are known as "football" were being played at colleges and universities in the United States in the first half of the 19th century. American football resulted from several major divergences from rugby, most notably the rule changes instituted by Walter Camp, the "Father of American football". Basketball was invented in 1891 by James Naismith, a Canadian physical education instructor working in Springfield, Massachusetts, in the United States. Volleyball was created in Holyoke, Massachusetts, a city directly north of Springfield, in 1895.

Themes and traditions 

Western culture has developed many themes and traditions, the most significant of which are:
 Greco-Roman classic letters, arts, architecture, philosophical and cultural tradition, which include the influence of preeminent authors and philosophers such as Socrates, Plato, Aristotle, Homer, Virgil, and Cicero, as well as a long mythologic tradition.
 Christian ethical, philosophical, and mythological tradition, stemming largely from the Christian Bible, particularly the New Testament Gospels.
 Monasteries, schools, libraries, books, book making, universities, teaching, education, and lecture halls.
 A tradition of the importance of the rule of law.
 Secular humanism, rationalism and Enlightenment thought. This set the basis for a new critical attitude and open questioning of religion, favouring freethinking and questioning of the church as an authority, which resulted in open-minded and reformist ideals inside, such as liberation theology, which partly adopted these currents, and secular and political tendencies such as separation of church and state (sometimes termed laicism), agnosticism and atheism.
 Generalized usage of some form of the Latin or Greek alphabet, and derived forms, such as Cyrillic, used by those southern and eastern Slavic countries of Christian Orthodox tradition, historically under the Byzantine Empire and later within the Russian czarist or the Soviet area of influence. Other variants of the Latin or Greek alphabets are found in the Gothic and Coptic alphabets, which historically superseded older scripts, such as runes, and the Egyptian Demotic and Hieroglyphic systems.
 Natural law, human rights, constitutionalism, parliamentarism (or presidentialism) and formal liberal democracy in recent times—prior to the 19th century, most Western governments were still monarchies.
 A large influence, in modern times, of many of the ideals and values developed and inherited from Romanticism.
 An emphasis on, and use of, science as a means of understanding the natural world and humanity's place in it.
 More pronounced use and application of innovation and scientific developments, as well as a more rational approach to scientific progress (what has been known as the scientific method).

See also

Notes

References

Citations

Sources 
 
 Ankerl, Guy (2000). Coexisting Civilizations: Arabo-Muslim, Bharati, Chinese, and Western. INUPRESS, Geneva, 119–244. .
 Atle Hesmyr (2013). Civilization, Oikos, and Progress 
 Barzun, Jacques From Dawn to Decadence: 500 Years of Western Cultural Life 1500 to the Present HarperCollins (2000) .
 Daly, Jonathan. "The Rise of Western Power: A Comparative History of Western Civilization " (London and New York: Bloomsbury, 2014). .
 Daly, Jonathan. "Historians Debate the Rise of the West" (London and New York: Routledge, 2015). .
 Derry, T. K. and Williams, Trevor I. A Short History of Technology: From the Earliest Times to A.D. 1900 Dover (1960) .
 Duran, Eduardo, Bonnie Dyran Native American Postcolonial Psychology 1995 Albany: State University of New York Press 
 Hanson, Victor Davis; Heath, John (2001). Who Killed Homer: The Demise of Classical Education and the Recovery of Greek Wisdom, Encounter Books.
 Jones, Prudence and Pennick, Nigel A History of Pagan Europe Barnes & Noble (1995) .
 Meaney, Thomas  “The Return of ‘The West’” New York Times March 11, 2022.
 Merriman, John Modern Europe: From the Renaissance to the Present W. W. Norton (1996) .
 McClellan, James E. III and Dorn, Harold Science and Technology in World History Johns Hopkins University Press (1999) .
 Stein, Ralph The Great Inventions Playboy Press (1976) .
 Asimov, Isaac Asimov's Biographical Encyclopedia of Science and Technology: The Lives & Achievements of 1510 Great Scientists from Ancient Times to the Present Revised second edition, Doubleday (1982) .
 Pastor, Ludwig von, History of the Popes from the Close of the Middle Ages; Drawn from the Secret Archives of the Vatican and other original sources, 40 vols. St. Louis, B. Herder (1898ff.)
 Walsh, James Joseph, The Popes and Science; the History of the Papal Relations to Science During the Middle Ages and Down to Our Own Time, Fordam University Press, 1908, reprinted 2003, Kessinger Publishing.  Reviews: p. 462.
 Stearns, P.N. (2003). Western Civilization in World History, Routledge, New York.
 Thornton, Bruce (2002). Greek Ways: How the Greeks Created Western Civilization, Encounter Books.
  Ferguson, Niall, Civilization. The West and the rest, Penguin Press, 2011. 
  Pinker, Steven, Enlightenment Now: The Case for Reason, Science, Humanism, and Progress, Penguin Books, 2018. 
  Henrich, Joseph, The WEIRDest People in the World: How the West Became Psychologically Peculiar and Particularly Prosperous, Farrar, Straus and Giroux, 2020. 
  Stark, Rodney, The Victory of Reason: How Christianity Led to Freedom, Capitalism, and Western Success, Random House, 2006. 
  Stark, Rodney, How the West Won: The Neglected Story of the Triumph of Modernity, Intercollegiate Studies Institute, 2014. 
 Headley, John M. The Europeanization of the World: On the Origins of Human Rights and Democracy, Princeton University Press, 2007.

Further reading 
 Barzun, Jacques. From Dawn to Decadence: 500 Years of Western Cultural Life : 1500 to the Present. New York: HarperCollins, 2001.
 Hesmyr, Atle Kultorp: Civilization; Its Economic Basis, Historical Lessons and Future Prospects (Telemark: Nisus Publications, 2020).

External links 

 An overview of the Western Civilization

 
Cultural anthropology
Sociological terminology